Milton Center is a village in Wood County, Ohio, United States. The population was 144 at the 2010 census.

History
Milton Center was platted in 1857. The village took its name from Milton Township. A post office called Milton Centre was established in 1861, and the name was changed to Milton Center in 1893. The village was incorporated in 1869.

Geography
Milton Center is located at  (41.301347, -83.829233).

Demographics

2010 census
As of the census of 2010, there were 144 people, 53 households, and 37 families living in the village. The racial makeup of the village was 91.7% White, 0.7% Native American, 5.6% from other races, and 2.1% from two or more races. Hispanic or Latino of any race were 22.9% of the population.

There were 53 households, of which 34.0% had children under the age of 18 living with them, 50.9% were married couples living together, 15.1% had a female householder with no husband present, 3.8% had a male householder with no wife present, and 30.2% were non-families. 26.4% of all households were made up of individuals, and 11.4% had someone living alone who was 65 years of age or older. The average household size was 2.72 and the average family size was 3.35.

The median age in the village was 36.5 years. 31.2% of residents were under the age of 18; 4.2% were between the ages of 18 and 24; 20.9% were from 25 to 44; 27.2% were from 45 to 64; and 16.7% were 65 years of age or older. The gender makeup of the village was 46.5% male and 53.5% female.

2000 census
As of the census of 2000, there were 195 people, 67 households, and 47 families living in the village. The population density was 488.3 people per square mile (188.2/km2). There were 73 housing units at an average density of 182.8 per square mile (70.5/km2). The racial makeup of the village was 90.26% White, 3.08% Native American, 5.13% from other races, and 1.54% from two or more races. Hispanic or Latino of any race were 17.44% of the population.

There were 67 households, out of which 31.3% had children under the age of 18 living with them, 55.2% were married couples living together, 13.4% had a female householder with no husband present, and 28.4% were non-families. 19.4% of all households were made up of individuals, and 6.0% had someone living alone who was 65 years of age or older. The average household size was 2.91 and the average family size was 3.27.

In the village, the population was spread out, with 26.2% under the age of 18, 12.8% from 18 to 24, 32.8% from 25 to 44, 17.4% from 45 to 64, and 10.8% who were 65 years of age or older. The median age was 35 years. For every 100 females there were 99.0 males. For every 100 females age 18 and over, there were 108.7 males.

The median income for a household in the village was $31,563, and the median income for a family was $42,083. Males had a median income of $30,417 versus $25,000 for females. The per capita income for the village was $13,513. About 6.4% of families and 9.7% of the population were below the poverty line, including 4.2% of those under the age of eighteen and none of those 65 or over.

References

Villages in Wood County, Ohio
Villages in Ohio